The Mullard Award is awarded annually by the Royal Society to a person who has "an outstanding academic record in any field of natural science, engineering or technology and whose contribution is currently making or has the potential to make a contribution to national prosperity in Britain." It was established in 1967, and has been awarded to more people at once than any other Royal Society medal, with five individuals receiving the award in 1970. The award is a silver gilt medal, which comes with a £2,000 prize and a £1,500 grant to be used for travel and attending conferences.

Mullard medallists

Table notes

See also
 Lists of science and technology awards

References

External links

Awards established in 1967
Awards of the Royal Society
1967 in science